The Coupe de France Final 1918 was a football match held at Légion Saint-Michel field, Paris on May 5, 1918, that saw Olympique de Pantin defeat FC Lyon 3–0 thanks to goals by A. Fievet (2) and Louis Darques.

Match details

See also
Coupe de France 1917-1918

External links
Coupe de France results at Rec.Sport.Soccer Statistics Foundation
Report on French federation site

1918
Coupe De France Final
May 1918 sports events
1918 in Paris